Fumito Tomoi , born 16 December 1974 in Nagoya, Japan) is a Japanese television host and entrepreneur that lived in Lithuania for 14 years. He was the host of Takeši Pilis, a popular Lithuanian show based on the Japanese TV show Takeshi's Castle. 

Tomoi Fumito arrived to Lithuania in 1993, studied philology and history, 2006 completed archaeologic master degree in Vilnius University.

References

External links 
"Fumito Tomoi ieškojimų kelias", 2009, 15min.lt
"Fumito Tomoi: Lietuvoje yra daug žmonių, kurių norėčiau atsiprašyti", moteris.lt 

Japanese television personalities
Japanese expatriates in Lithuania
Living people
1974 births
People from Nagoya